Sportsmen Acres is a town in Mayes County, Oklahoma, United States. The population was 322 at the 2010 census.  Incorporated in 1972, Sportsmen Acres is primarily a residential community.  It is located seven miles southeast of Pryor on Oklahoma State Highway 69A, and one mile east of the MidAmerica Industrial Park.

Geography
Sportsmen Acres is located at  (36.245825, -95.251424).  

Demographics

As of 2010 Sportsmen Acres had a population of 322.  The racial and ethnic composition of the population was 70.5% white, 20.2% Native American, 0.3% Filipino, 1.2% from some other race and 7.8% from two or more races.  2.8% of the population was Hispanic or Latino of any race.

As of the census of 2000, there were 204 people, 58 households, and 52 families residing in the town. There were 63 housing units at an average density of 758.7 per square mile (304.1/km2). The racial makeup of the town was 85.29% White, 6.37% Native American, 4.90% Asian, and 3.43% from two or more races. Hispanic or Latino of any race were 0.49% of the population.

There were 58 households, out of which 55.2% had children under the age of 18 living with them, 81.0% were married couples living together, 6.9% had a female householder with no husband present, and 10.3% were non-families. 8.6% of all households were made up of individuals, and 3.4% had someone living alone who was 65 years of age or older. The average household size was 3.52 and the average family size was 3.73.

In the town, the population was spread out, with 36.3% under the age of 18, 12.3% from 18 to 24, 25.5% from 25 to 44, 21.6% from 45 to 64, and 4.4% who were 65 years of age or older. The median age was 26 years. For every 100 females, there were 85.5 males. For every 100 females age 18 and over, there were 88.4 males.

The median income for a household in the town was $37,222, and the median income for a family was $38,333. Males had a median income of $30,909 versus $21,000 for females. The per capita income for the town was $14,233. About 3.6% of families and 4.6% of the population were below the poverty line, including 7.1% of those under the age of eighteen and none of those 65 or over.

References 

Towns in Mayes County, Oklahoma
Towns in Oklahoma